A Rose by Any Other Name is the fifth studio album by American country music artist Ronnie Milsap. It was released in 1975 by Warner Bros. Records. Five tracks of the album were recycled from Ronnie Milsap. "Me and You, You and Me" was recorded at Quadrophonic studios in Nashville, Produced by Glen Spreen.

The album reached #23 on Country charts. Allmusic stated that the additions to the tracks from Ronnie Milsap "push[ed] the album closer toward country" than the debut but that it "doesn't hold together as well as the original debut." The publication described the album "as a fitfully entertaining record instead of a cohesive one."

Track listing

Chart

References
Erlewine, Stephen. [ A Rose By Any Other Name], Allmusic.

1975 albums
Ronnie Milsap albums
Albums produced by Chips Moman
Warner Records albums